Cana is an extinct genus of prehistoric radiolarians in the extinct family Pantanelliidae. The species C. elegans is from the Cretaceous of Northwest Turkey.

References 

 Early Cretaceous Pantanelliidae (Radiolaria) from Northwest Turkey. Figen A. Mekik, Micropaleontology, Vol. 46, No. 1 (Spring, 2000), pages 1–30 (Stable URL at jstor)
 Radiolaria: Siliceous Plankton through Time

External links 

Prehistoric eukaryote genera
Radiolarian genera